Shwebaung is a village in Madaya Township in Pyin Oo Lwin District in the Mandalay Division of central Burma. It lies just south east of Thapandaung.

External links
Maplandia World Gazetteer

Populated places in Pyin Oo Lwin District
Madaya Township